Derrick Dewayne Zimmerman (born December 2, 1981) is an American former professional basketball player. He played collegiately at Mississippi State University.

College career
For the Mississippi State Bulldogs, he averaged 8.9 points, 5.5 assists, 4.2 rebounds, 1.9 steals and 0.8 blocks. He shot 15 of 52 three-pointers as a senior and 64.9% on free throws.

Professional career
He was selected 40th overall in the 2003 NBA Draft by the Golden State Warriors, and played two games with the NBA's New Jersey Nets during the 2005-06 season. 

Those two games ended up being Zimmerman's only playing time in the NBA. His 2nd game ever (also his final NBA game ever) was played on April 19th, 2006 in a 83 - 90 loss to the New York Knicks where he recorded 4 points, 5 assists and 1 rebound.

He played in the NBA D-League for the Columbus Riverdragons (2004–05) and Austin Toros (2005–06). Derrick was named the NBDL's Defensive Player of the Year for two consecutive seasons (Austin 2005-06, Columbus 2004-05). In December 2006, he signed a one-month contract with Brose Baskets of the German Basketball Bundesliga. After his contract expired, he signed with Italian team Air Avellino until the end of the season.

In the summer of 2008, he signed with the Ukrainian club Budivelnyk Kyiv. He stayed in Ukraine till 2013, and later played with Hoverla Ivano-Frankivsk, Kyiv and Dnipro-Azot.

In February 2013, Zimmerman moved to Germany and signed with Neckar Riesen Ludwigsburg for the rest of the season. In January 2014, after a couple months without a club, he signed with Energa Czarni Słupsk of Poland for the rest of the season.

References

External links

Legabasket.it profile 
Eurobasket.com profile 
FIBA.com profile

1981 births
Living people
American expatriate basketball people in Bosnia and Herzegovina
American expatriate basketball people in Germany
American expatriate basketball people in Italy
American expatriate basketball people in Poland
American expatriate basketball people in Ukraine
American men's basketball players
Austin Toros players
Basketball players from Louisiana
BC Budivelnyk players
BC Dnipro-Azot players
BC Hoverla players
BC Kyiv players
Brose Bamberg players
Columbus Riverdragons players
Czarni Słupsk players
Golden State Warriors draft picks
HKK Široki players
Riesen Ludwigsburg players
Mississippi State Bulldogs men's basketball players
New Jersey Nets players
Point guards
S.S. Felice Scandone players
Shooting guards
Sportspeople from Monroe, Louisiana